The 11th Rhythmic Gymnastics Asian Championships was held in Pattaya, Thailand from June 20 to 23, 2019.

Medal winners

Medal table

References

Rhythmic Gymnastics Asian Championships
2019 in Thai sport
Gymnastics competitions in Thailand
International gymnastics competitions hosted by Thailand
2019 in gymnastics
Asian Rhythmic Gymnastics Championships